Nardus is a genus of plants belonging to the grass family, containing the single species Nardus stricta, known as matgrass. It is placed in its own tribe Nardeae within the subfamily Pooideae. The name derives from ancient Greek  from the earlier Akkadian lardu. It is not to be confused with spikenard, Nardostachys jatamansi.

Distribution and ecology
Nardus stricta is native to Eurasia (from Iceland and the Azores to Mongolia), North Africa (Algeria, Morocco), and northeastern North America (Greenland, eastern Canada, and the northeastern United States).

Nardus stricta occurs on heath, moorland, hills, and mountains on nutrient poor acidic sandy to peaty soils and is strongly calcifuge, avoiding calcareous soils. Nardus stricta may also become a dominant species in habitats grazed by cattle or sheep because it is tough and unpalatable.

It flowers from June until August. Apomixis is found to be common in this plant, with extensive colonies often proving to be a single clone.

Description

The roots and shoots are very closely packed together at the base of the plant producing a white, tough, highly reflective feature. The spikelets are very slender and loosely overlapping in two rows each side of the spikelet axis. Each lemma is tipped with a short awn.

References

External links

 USDA Plants Database
 Germplasm Resources Information Network (GRIN)
Global Biodiversity Information Facility (GBIF)
Original description by Carl Linnaeus in Species Plantarum (1753)

Pooideae
Monotypic Poaceae genera